Charles Kalev "Chuck" Ehin (Born July 1, 1961) is a former American football Defensive end/Nose tackle in the National Football League (NFL). He was drafted by the San Diego Chargers in the 12th round of the 1983 NFL Draft. He also played for the Indianapolis Colts and the Dallas Cowboys. The first Estonian-American to play in the NFL, Ehin played college football at Brigham Young University, where he also earned a bachelor's degree in business. He graduated from Layton High School in Layton, Utah in 1979, and was listed among the 1979 National Top 100 High School athletes.

References

1961 births
Living people
People from Marysville, California
Players of American football from California
American football defensive tackles
American football defensive ends
San Diego Chargers players
Sportspeople from Greater Sacramento
BYU Cougars football players